The 1991 NCAA Division III men's basketball tournament was the 17th annual single-elimination tournament to determine the national champions of National Collegiate Athletic Association (NCAA) men's Division III collegiate basketball in the United States.

Held during March 1991, the field included forty teams. The championship rounds were contested in Springfield, Ohio.

Wisconsin–Platteville (28–3) defeated Franklin & Marshall, 81–74, to clinch their first NCAA Division III national title.

Championship Rounds
Site: Springfield, Ohio

See also
1991 NCAA Division I men's basketball tournament
1991 NCAA Division II men's basketball tournament
1991 NCAA Division III women's basketball tournament
1991 NAIA Division I men's basketball tournament

References

NCAA Division III men's basketball tournament
NCAA Men's Division III Basketball
Ncaa Tournament
NCAA Division III basketball tournament